Guela, also known as Ngela (or Guéla/Ngéla), is a region of the Congo-Brazzaville with about 4000 inhabitants.

Geography of the Republic of the Congo
Places

Regions of Africa